Mount Qingcheng is a mountain in Dujiangyan City, Chengdu, Sichuan, China. It may also refer to:
 The Dujiangyan irrigation system, part of Mount Qingcheng and the Dujiangyan Irrigation System, UNESCO World Heritage Site No. 1001
 Mount Qingcheng, part of Sichuan Giant Panda Sanctuaries - Wolong, Mount Siguniang and Jiajin Mountains, UNESCO World Heritage Site No. 1213
 Qingchengshan railway station, named after the Mount Qingcheng in Dujiangyan City, Chengdu, Sichuan, China.